Nalini Bekal (born 15 October 1954) is a Malayalam novelist and short story writer. She has written many novels and short stories, and won many awards including the Mathrubhumi Novel Award (1977), Edasseri Award (1987), SBI Award (1992), and Kerala Sahitya Academy Fellowship.

Personal life

Nalini was born in Bekal village in Kasaragod District of Kerala State. Nalini's husband Paipra Radhakrishnan is a famous writer, columnist and critic in the Malayalam language.  They have two daughters, Dr. Anuradha (Ayurveda Medical Officer) and Anuja Akathoottu.

Works
 Novels
Thuruth (1977)
Hamsaganam (1982)
Krishna (1985)
Muchilottamma (1987)
Kanwatheertha (1988)
Shilavanangal (1993)

 Short story collections
Ottakkolam (1993)

Awards and recognitions
 Literary awards
 1977: Mathrubhumi Novel Award for Thruthu
 1987: Edasseri Award for Mutchilottamma
 1992: SBI Award for Mutchilottamma

 Fellowships
 1995: Kerala Sahithya Academy Fellowship

References

1954 births
Living people
Novelists from Kerala
Indian women novelists
Indian women short story writers
Malayalam-language writers
Malayalam novelists
20th-century Indian novelists
20th-century Indian short story writers
20th-century Indian women writers
Women writers from Kerala
People from Kasaragod district